Royal Air Force Station Kaldadarnes or more simply RAF Kaldadarnes is a former Royal Air Force station, near the town of Selfoss, Iceland.

Beginnings

The station was built in 1940 by the British Army and used by the Royal Air Force from March 1941 and throughout the remainder of the Second World War.

On 2 September 1942 the war artist Eric Ravilious was lost after he flew from Kaldadarnes.

Squadrons

After the cessation of hostilities of the Second World War the British Government handed the airfield over to the Icelandic Civil Aviation Authority and it was used for a short while until it was closed. It is now in ruins with the decaying runways, perimeter track, dispersals and site of some of the buildings still visible on satellite images in 2018.

There is a memorial to No. 269 Squadron RAF at the closest public access point, situated in the modern airfield of Selfoss.

References

Citations

Bibliography

 

Kal
World War II sites in Iceland
Military history of Iceland during World War II
Southern Region (Iceland)